Wang Chaoqun (born November 1942) is a retired lieutenant general (zhong jiang) of the People's Liberation Army Air Force (PLAAF) of China. He served as Deputy Commander of the PLAAF and  Commander of the Chengdu Military Region Air Force.

Biography
Wang Chaoqun was born in November 1942 in Jiading, Shanghai. He enlisted in the PLAAF in July 1959, and was trained at the PLAAF No. 5 Aviator School. He later graduated from the PLA National Defence University.

Wang was appointed chief of staff of the Beijing Military Region Air Force in October 1992, and deputy commander of the Beijing MRAF in December 1995. In December 2000, he was promoted to commander of the Chengdu Military Region Air Force and concurrently deputy commander of the Chengdu MR. In 2003, he was transferred to the PLAAF headquarters to serve as its deputy commander. In 2004, he participated in the first Sino-Russian joint military exercise. He retired from active service in December 2005.

Wang attained the rank of senior colonel in September 1988, major general in July 1993, and lieutenant general in July 2001. He was a member of the 10th and the 11th National People's Congress.

References

1942 births
Living people
People's Liberation Army Air Force generals
People's Liberation Army generals from Shanghai
PLA National Defence University alumni
Delegates to the 10th National People's Congress
Delegates to the 11th National People's Congress